The women's shot put at the 2019 Asian Athletics Championships was held on 21 April.

Results

References 
 Results

Shot
Shot put at the Asian Athletics Championships
2019 in women's athletics